Raja Shivaji Vidyalaya is one of the three medium high schools (formerly known as King George High School), in the Dadar neighborhood of Mumbai, Maharastra, India. Raja Shivaji is a Marathi medium school and the Indian Education Society's aka IES English Medium is the larger part of the school. There is also a small Gujarati medium section in the premises. The school was founded in 1912, and named in honor King George V who had visited India in 1911.  It was renamed in 1974, at which time it switched from an English language curriculum to a Marathi curriculum.  It has since resumed English education, becoming a "semi-English" (mixed English/Marathi) institution. In 2012, former President of India, Pratibha Patil was the guest of honor at the school's centenary celebration. 

Lt. Shri Akshikar founded Dadar English School before 1911. The teachers working there Lt. Shri Nagesh Mahadev Kale, Lt. Shri Krushnaji Mahadev Barve,  Lt. Shri Deshmukh, Lt. Shri Koranne and Lt. Shri Aaras, who were highly motivated, came together and decided to start an Independent School. During the period of 1911 King George V from England visited India. He was known for his calm nature and was extremely inclined towards education. During his visit, he announced the slogan ‘Educate and Agitate’. He encouraged people to open schools for spreading awareness of literacy. At times he even extended his help for this noble cause. Inspired by his efforts these five Jewels got encouraged and started a school named ‘King George English School’ on 10 January 1912. It had started near Portuguese Church in premises of Padwal's Bungalow and in Kalgutkar's Chawl. They offered their full co-operation in progress of the school. In 1924 a plot was purchased by Lt. Shri Kale and Lt. Shri Khopkar in Hindu Colony. On 2 June 1974, the school was renamed as ‘Raja Shivaji Vidyalaya’.The school is regarded as one of the best schools in Mumbai city.

I.E.S RAJA SHIVAJI VIDYALAYA,
RAJA SHIVAJI VIDYA SANKUL,
HINDU COLONY, DADAR (EAST),
MUMBAI - 400014.
PH - 022-61379595

Notable alumni
Notable alumni of the school include:
 Murlidhar Chandrakant Bhandare, governor of Orissa
 Prashant Damle, actor
 Madhav Mantri, cricketer
 Dilip Vengsarkar, cricketer
 Bhargavi Chirmule, actor
 Bhalchandra Udgaonkar, Particle physicist and Padma Bhushan awardee
 Chetan Shashital, voice artist
 Renuka Shahane, actor
 Sanjay Manjrekar, cricketer
 Deepak Mandke, architect planner
 Pallavi Joshi
 Rajeshwari Sachdev
 Urmila Matondkar
 Vaidehi Parashurami

See also
 List of schools in Mumbai

References

High schools and secondary schools in Mumbai
1912 establishments in India
Educational institutions established in 1912
Monuments and memorials to Shivaji